Cinchona pubescens, also known as red cinchona and quina (Kina) ( Cascarilla, cinchona;  quina-do-amazonas, quineira), is native to Central and South America. It is known as a medicinal plant for its bark's high quinine content- and has similar uses to Cinchona officinalis in the production of quinine, most famously used for treatment of malaria.

Description
C. pubescens varies from small to large in size, growing to 10 meters in height (33 ft). When cut, the bark tends to turn red. Leaves are elliptical to oblate and thin. The leaves have pubescent teeth that turn red when they are older, hence its nickname the red quinine tree. Its flowers form in large panicles. They are pink and fragrant, while in the Galapagos they are light pink.

Ecology
C. pubescens has the widest distribution of all Cinchona species, with the native range spanning Costa Rica, Panama, Venezuela, Colombia, Ecuador, Peru, and Bolivia. It also grows well in volcanic soil with high nutrient levels.

C. pubescens is a resilient species that is able to recover from even extreme damage. If the tree is felled but the stump is left, it can grow back new stalks. If the bark is removed and the xylem is exposed to the elements, the tree will grow the bark back. The tree can even grow back if roots that are left in the ground are larger than 2 cm in diameter.

It reproduces rapidly and spreads its seeds via wind. It reaches maturity and begins seeding in 4 years. Growing at a rate of 1–2 m per year, it quickly reaches a tall height where it can shade out the rest of the native plants. Adult trees grow much slower than juveniles.

Invasive species
It has become an invasive species where planted outside of its native range, especially on tropical climate islands such as the Galapagos, Hawaii, and Tahiti. In the Galapagos it has become a dominant species in the formerly shrub dominated Miconia and Fern-Sedge zones  on Santa Cruz Island. It has been subject to control in the Galapagos National Park to reduce its impacts using a variety of methods. However, controlling it over its total range on Santa Cruz island would cost US$1.65 million according to research done through the Charles Darwin Foundation.

According to Jäger et al. 2007, the species richness on Santa Cruz Island, Galapagos Islands has declined by 33% in the Miconia Zone and 10% in the Fern-Sedge Zone since the introduction C. pubescens. It is also invasive in Hawaii, on Maui and the Big Island  C. pubescens was first introduced to these to be cultivated for quinine harvesting.

Control Strategies
There are currently two strategies for removal of C. pubescens. They include a physical method and a chemical method. The physical method involves manually felling adult trees and fully removing the stumps. Samplings must be pulled out of the soil. The chemical method uses herbicides diluted in water and sprayed on hack marks on the bark. Buddenhagen et al. tried this at the Galapagos Island National Park using a mixture of picloram and metsulfuron. This technique has been recommended to be performed in Tahiti and Hawaii since it is an invasive there as well.

Buddenhagen et al. 2004 analyzed data using six different herbicide methods from 1999 to 2002 with a different trial each year: picloram salt, triclopyr ester, triclopyr salt, glyphosate, diesel fuel, and picloram and metsulfuron. The herbicide was sprayed onto the trees where they were hacked with machetes. In the first trial, triclopyr ester could control C. pubescens with 77% chance of the trees dying. In the second trial, a picloram and metsulfuron solution was 100% successful in concentrations greater than 4% solution. In the third trial, picloram- metsulfuron solution of 10% concentrations or higher was successful in eradicating the tree.

References

Sources 

Acosta Solis, M. 1945. Botánica de las Cinchonas. Pages 29–55 in M. Acosta Solis, editor. Flora. Instituto Ecuadoriano de Ciencias Naturales, Quito.
Acosta Solis, M. 1945. Habitat y distribución de las Cinchonas en el Ecuador.
Pages 8–19 in M. Acosta Solis, editor. Flora. Instituto Ecuadoriano de Ciencias Naturales, Quito.
Buddenhagen, C., and P. Yánez. 2005. The cost of quinine Cinchona pubescens control on Santa Cruz Island, Galapagos. Galapagos Research 63:32-36.
Buddenhagen, C. E., J. L. Rentería, M. Gardener, S. R. Wilkinson, M. Soria, P. Yánez, A. Tye, and R. Valle. 2004. The Control of a Highly Invasive Tree Cinchona pubescens in Galapagos. Weed Technology 18:1194-1202.
Cronk, Q. a. J. F. 1995. Plant Invaders: The threat to natural ecosystems. Chapman and Hall, London.
Gibbs, J. P., W. G. Shriver, and H. Vargas. 2003. An assessment of a Galapagos Rail population over thirteen years (1986 to 2000). Journal of Field Ornithology 7*:136-140.
Jäger, H. 1999. Impact of the introduced tree Cinchona pubescens Vahl. on the native flora of the highlands of Santa Cruz Island (Galapagos Islands). Page 102. University of Oldenburg, Oldenburg.
Jäger, H., A. Tye, and I. Kowarik. 2007. Tree invasion in naturally treeless environments: Impacts of quinine (Cinchona pubescens) trees on native vegetation in Galápagos. Biological Conservation 140(3-4):297-307.
/Kastdalen, A. 1982. Changes in the biology of Santa Cruz 1935-1965. Noticias de Galapagos 35:7-12.
Kinyuy, W. C., D. Palevitch, and E. Putievsky. 1993. Through integrated biomedical\ethnomedical preparations and ethnotaxonomy, effective malaria and diabetic treatments have evolved. International symposium on medicinal and aromatic plants, Tiberias on the Sea of Galilee, Israel:205-214.
Lawesson, J. E. 1990. Alien plants in the Galapagos Islands, a summary. Pages 15–20 in J. E. Lawesson, O. Hamann, G. Rogers, G. Reck, and H. Ochoa, editors. Botanical research and management in Galapagos. Missouri Botanical Garden, St. Louis, MO.
Macdonald, I. A. W., L. Ortiz, J. E. Lawesson, and J. B. Nowak. 1988. The invasion of highlands in Galapagos by the red quinine-tree Cinchona succirubra. Environmental Conservation 15:215-220.
Mauchamp, A. 1997. Threats from alien plant species in the Galapagos Islands. Conservation Biology 11:260-263.
Moll, E. J. 1998. A further report on the distributions of introduced plants on Santa Cruz Island, Galapagos. University of Queensland School of Natural and Rural Systems Management.
Prado, G. 1986. Censo de especies arboreas introducidas en la zona agricola de la Isla Santa Cruz. Charles Darwin Research Station, Puerto Ayora.
Rentería, Jorge Luis; Rachel Atkinson, Ana Mireya Guerrero, Johanna Mader 2006. Manual de Identification y Manejo de Malezas en las Islas Galápagos. Segunda edición, Fundación Charles Darwin, Santa Cruz, Galápagos, Ecuador.
Rentería, J. L., and C. Buddenhagen. 2006. Invasive plants in the Scalesia pedunculata forest at Los Gemelos, Santa Cruz, Galapagos. Galapagos Research 64:31-35.
Sauer, J. D. 1988. Plant migration; The dynamics of geographic patterning in seed plant species. University of California Press, Berkeley.
Schmidt, S. K., and K. M. Scow. 1986. Mycorrhizal fungi on the Galapagos Islands. Biotropica 18:236-240.
Schofield, E. K. 1989. Effects of introduced plants and animals on island vegetation: Examples from the Galapagos archipelago. Conservation Biology 3:227-238.
Schofield, E. O. 1973. Galapagos flora: the threat of introduced plants. Biological Conservation 3:48-51.
Starr, F., Starr, K., and Loope, L. 2003. Cinchona pubescens. Report for the Hawaiian Ecosystems at Risk project [http://www.hear.org (HEAR).
Tuoc, L. T. 1983. Some thoughts on the control of introduced plants. Noticias de Galapagos 37:25-26.
Tuoc, L. T., and E. Potts. 1983. A preliminary study of the use of herbicides to eradicate Cinchona succirubra on Santa Cruz, Galapagos. Pages 15–16. Annual Report of the Charles Darwin Research Station, Galapagos, Ecuador.
Tye, A. 2000. Invasive plant problems and requirements for weed risk assessment in the Galapagos Islands. Pages 153–175 in R. H. Groves, F. D. Panetta, and J. G. Virtue, editors. Weed Risk Assessment. CSIRO Publishing, Collingwood, Australia.
Utreras, M. 1983. Distribucion de la guayaba (Psidium guajava) y applicacion de tres quimicos (herbicidas) para su control en la isla Santa Cruz, Galapagos. Estacion Cientifica Charles Darwin, Puerto Ayora, Galapagos.
van der Werff, H. 1979. Conservation and vegetation of the Galapagos Islands. Pages Chapter 20; 391–404 in D. Bramwell, editor. Plants and Islands. Academic Press, London and New York.

pubescens
Flora of Costa Rica
Flora of Panama
Flora of Colombia
Flora of Venezuela
Flora of Ecuador
Flora of Bolivia
Medicinal plants of Central America
Quinine
Medicinal plants of South America
Trees of Peru
Taxa named by Martin Vahl
Plants described in 1790